"I Don't Wanna Be a Soldier, Mama" (also known as I Don't Want to Be a Soldier and I Don’t Want To Be A Soldier, Mama, I Don’t Wanna Die) is a song written and performed by John Lennon, and released in 1971 as the fifth track on his second studio album, Imagine. The song's lyrics oppose the expectations of society.

Recording 
This song was first recorded, along with "It's So Hard", during the February 1971 sessions that also yielded the "Power to the People" single. The song began as a studio jam. Take 2, described as a raw, funk version of Lennon's song "Well Well Well", was included in the John Lennon Anthology box set. Lennon was unhappy with this version and re-recorded it during the Imagine sessions.

The final version of the song is the only song on Imagine to feature Phil Spector's Wall of Sound effect to its full extent.

Lyrics 
The song contains only 25 different words, very similar to Lennon's song "I Want You (She's So Heavy)", from the Beatles 1969 album Abbey Road.

Reception 
In a review for the Imagine album, Ben Gerson of Rolling Stone described the song as "an enumeration of all the roles John withdraws from," along with describing Lennon's vocals as sounding "both long-suffering and cruel." Gerson also compared the song's melody to the Kinks' "You Really Got Me". In Christgau's Record Guide: Rock Albums of the Seventies (1981), Robert Christgau called the song "an instant folk extravaganza worthy of Phil Spector".

Covers 
The song was covered by grunge supergroup Mad Season in 1995 and released as a bonus track on the deluxe version of their only studio album, Above, in 2013. The cover features lead vocals by Layne Staley.  The track was also reimagined by Cowboy Junkies on their 2005 studio album Early 21st Century Blues, including a rap element from Kevin "Rebel" Bond.

Personnel 
 John Lennon – vocals, electric guitar
 George Harrison – slide guitar
 Joey Molland – acoustic guitar
 Tom Evans – acoustic guitar
 Klaus Voormann – bass guitar
 Nicky Hopkins – piano
 King Curtis - saxophones
 Jim Keltner – drums
 Mike Pinder – tambourine
Personnel per the album's inner sleeve notes.

References 

1971 songs
English folk songs
John Lennon songs
Songs written by John Lennon
Song recordings produced by John Lennon
Song recordings produced by Yoko Ono
Songs about soldiers
Songs about the military